Lago Argentino is a lake in the Patagonian province of Santa Cruz, Argentina, at .

The lake lies within the Los Glaciares National Park in a landscape with numerous glaciers and is fed by the glacial meltwater of several rivers, the water from Lake Viedma brought by the La Leona River, and many mountain streams. Waters from Lake Argentino flow into the Atlantic Ocean through the Santa Cruz River.

The glaciers, the nearby town of El Calafate and the lake itself are important tourist destinations. The lake in particular is appreciated for fishing. Perch, common galaxias ("puyen grande"), lake trout and rainbow trout — in both anadromous and Potamodromous forms — are all found.

Lago Argentino was also the name of the airport that served the area until 2000. This airport is currently closed, and its runway was incorporated into the city's road system. It has been replaced by Comandante Armando Tola International Airport, which serves the town of El Calafate and Lago Argentino with many daily national and international flights.

Climate  
Argentino Lake has a cold desert climate (Köppen BWk).

Gallery

See also
 Lake Viedma
 Lake San Martín
 Puerto Bandera

References

External links
 Lake Argentino on the website of the International Lake Environment Committee Foundation
 Lago Argentino on the website of the government of Santa Cruz (in Spanish)
 Lago Argentino Airport at World Airport Codes and ICAO World Airfield Catalogue

Lakes of Santa Cruz Province, Argentina
Glacial lakes of Argentina
Lakes